Forest of Haguenau lies to the north of the town of Haguenau.

Many Bronze Age and Iron Age artifacts have been found in the forest. They are on display in the Musée historique de Haguenau.

References

Haguenau
Forests of France
Geography of Bas-Rhin
Tourist attractions in Bas-Rhin